Atherosclerosis is a monthly peer-reviewed scientific journal established in 1970 and published by Elsevier. It is the official journal of the European Atherosclerosis Society and is affiliated with the International Atherosclerosis Society.

Atherosclerosis brings together, from all sources, papers concerned with investigation on atherosclerosis, its risk factors and clinical manifestations. Atherosclerosis covers basic and translational, clinical and population research approaches to arterial and vascular biologyand disease, as well as their risk factors including: disturbances of lipid and lipoprotein metabolism, diabetes and hypertension, thrombosis, and inflammation. The journal can publish original or review papers dealing with the pathogenesis, environmental, genetic and epigenetic basis, diagnosis or treatment of atherosclerosis and related diseases as well as their risk factors.

The editor-in-chief is Arnold von Eckardstein. According to the Journal Citation Reports, the journal has a 2021 impact factor of 6.847.

Scope
The journal covers all aspects of atherosclerosis and related diseases.

Abstracting and indexing
This journal is abstracted and indexed in:

References

External links
 
 European Atherosclerosis Society

Elsevier academic journals
Publications established in 1970
Monthly journals
English-language journals
Cardiology journals
Academic journals associated with learned and professional societies